Duchess of York is the principal courtesy title held by the wife of the duke of York. Three of the eleven dukes of York either did not marry or had already assumed the throne prior to marriage, whilst two of the dukes married twice, therefore there have been only ten duchesses of York.

Duchesses of York

The ten duchesses of York (and the dates the individuals held that title) are as follows:

In 1791, Princess Frederica Charlotte of Prussia (1791–1820) married Prince Frederick, Duke of York and Albany (second son of King George III); she thus became HRH The Duchess of York and Albany. Her husband held one double dukedom (of York and Albany) rather than two. The Duchess received a warm welcome to Great Britain but following a troubled relationship with her husband, the couple separated. The two previous dukes of York and Albany had never married; since her husband was the last duke of York and Albany, Frederica was the only duchess with that double title.

Duchess of York eponyms

Ships
HMS Duchess of York (1801), built in Calcutta in 1801 and wrecked off Madagascar in 1811.
HMS Duchess of York (1898), a paddle steamer built by Barclay, Curle & Co. Ltd., Glasgow, used as a First World War minesweeper. Later renamed Duchess of Cornwall to allow for a new ship to take its name.
SS Duchess of York (1928), a steam turbine ocean liner built by John Brown & Co Ltd., Clydebank for Canadian Pacific Steamships. Sunk after being bombed in 1943.

Other
Duchess of York Ward, opened in 1935 at the Royal Hospital and Home for Incurables.

References

Bibliography
 ThePeerage.com; A source for peerage information
 

 
British monarchy
Lists of duchesses